Allah Bakhsh Malik is a social scientist, public policy advisor, academic, researcher, and author with experience in management, education and institutional and human development. He served as Secretary for Education during 2017-2019. Malik was conferred UNESCO Confucius Award in 2011.  He served as Secretary of Education to the Government of the Punjab and Secretary of National health Services, Pakistan. He also served as the Federal Health Secretary of Pakistan. He has also led professional teams in development sector in inter-sectoral, multi-temporal and cross-disciplinary fields in Education, Health, Governance, Institutional Development, Planning, Development and Reforms at national and international level. He retired from the Civil Service of Pakistan as Federal Secretary to the Government.

Malik was awarded the United Nations's UNESCO Confucius Prize for Literacy in recognition of a leadership role for the promotion of Literacy and Skill Development in the Punjab province in 2011, and is the first Pakistani and Muslim to receive this award. He represented Pakistan and Asia Pacific nations on the Board of Global Partnership for Education - GPE, The World Bank for three years.

Dr. Malik has worked as Managing Director Punjab Education Foundation, Secretary to the Government/Chairman BISE at Government of Punjab, Pakistan. As MD/CEO PEF Malik introduced Public Private Partnership - PPP in Education Sector in Pakistan (Foundation Assisted Schools - FAS) for the first time and now one of the largest programmes around the globe with 2.8 million children enrolled, . His model of PPP has been accepted as the world's best replicate model by the lead journal Economist, for low cost schools for affordable quality education. He introduced programs like Foundation Assisted Schools - FAS, Education Voucher Scheme - EVS, Teaching in Clusters by Subject Specialists - TICSS and Continuous Professional Development Program - CPDP. By now more than three million children are benefiting from PEF initiatives pioneered by Malik. He is considered as the 'god-father' and Educator to the Poor for affordable quality education in public private partnership for the low income and less-affluent families. Lahore University of Management Sciences - LUMS published a book, 'The Candles in the Dark' and a chapter has been dedicated to the work of Dr. Malik as CEO PEF - a rare distinction. His contribution in Human Development has been recognized at national and international level. 

Dr. Malik served as Director General & Program Director Directorate of Staff Development - DSD restructured and renamed in 2017 as Quaid e Azam Academy for Educational Development - QAED, Program Director Punjab Education Sector Reforms Program - PESRP. Dr. Malik served as Secretary to the Government, School Education Department, Government of Punjab, one of the largest education system in the world. His performance was highlighted as exemplary education leader by The Economist in February 2018.  He served as Federal/Additional Secretary to the Government of Pakistan, Ministry of Federal Education and Professional Training, Director General, Academy of Educational Planning and Management (AEPAM) and Director General, National Commission of Human Development. Malik has been recognized as a passionate educator for the less-privileged at national and international level because of his passion and services for affordable quality education for the less-affluent and disenfranchised sections of society in Pakistan and around the globe. Malik is Charles Wallace Trust Fellow of SOAS University of London UK and was appointed as Ambassador of British Alumni Association Pakistan.

Dr. Malik is the former Managing Director/Chief Executive Officer of the Punjab Education Foundation (PEF) (2004 to 2008). He revamped and restructured PEF as an autonomous organization established to forge public-private partnerships for the promotion of quality education for the less affluent and under-served marginalized sections of society at affordable cost. He developed and introduced for the first time in Pakistan, new instruments for affordable quality education through innovation. The Economist declared these instruments as the best designs and replicable model in the world. LUMS has published a landmark study on the best performing institutions in Pakistan, 'Candles in the Dark' and PEF is one of them with Dr. Malik as CEO of the organization. He served as Secretary Literacy and Basic Education Department with Skill Development Program and Secretary Youth Affairs (2009 to 2012) Government of Punjab Pakistan. He served as Federal/Additional Secretary to the Government of Pakistan for National Tariff Commission, Commerce and Textile Industry. Malik has several decades of experience in various aspects of the education sector and skill development: policy and situation analysis, assessment, policy formulation, strategic interventions, planning, implementation and monitoring and evaluation. He has vast experience in implementing social development projects focusing social and human development. Dr. Malik led one of the largest education system in the world as Secretary Education Punjab and introduced new instruments and maverick initiatives in collaboration with The World Bank, DFID, UNESCO and UNICEF. He restructured DSD into Quaid e Azam Academy for Educational Development - QAED, now one of the premier teacher training academy in the region.

Dr. Malik was elected Alternate Member of the Board of Global Partnership for Education - GPE for Asia Pacific Region. The Global Partnership for Education supports developing countries to ensure that every child receives a quality basic education, prioritizing the poorest, most vulnerable and those living in fragile and conflict-affected countries. Dr. Malik also worked with Asian Development Bank on Skills and Employment and skills required in fourth Industrial Revolution.  He was also Member of the Steering Committee and Drafting Group of Framework For Action beyond 2015 by UNESCO Paris. He is the founding trustee of Pakistan Alliance for Girls Education (PAGE). Dr. Malik also served as lead international consultant with the UNESCO, IUCN, Asian Development Bank, The British Council and many other international organizations. He worked as Advisor the Governments of South Africa, Philippines and Qatar for promoting affordable quality education. 

Malik is a Chevening Scholar and Charles Wallace Trust Fellow at SOAS, University of London. His work has been extensively published. He was conferred Global Excellence Award of Management in 2013. He was the first Chairman of National Curriculum Council, Government of Pakistan.
Malik in his early career served as Deputy Commissioner Chilas - Diamer, Gilgit, Muzzaffargarh and Pakpattan.

Dr. Malik is Post-Doc Visiting Scholar (2006-2008) in Economics of Education in Public Private Partnership: Freedom of Choice, Affordable Quality Education in Public Private Partnership from Teachers College, Columbia University, New York, USA. He is PhD in Development Economics, Public Finance and Resource Mobilization, Punjab University Lahore Pakistan. He completed his MPhil degree in Economics and Politics of Development from Cambridge University –United Kingdom. Dr. Malik formulated Punjab Youth Policy 2012, National TVET Policy 2015, Punjab Early Childhood Education and Development (ECED) and supervised the revision of National Education Policy 2009.

Dr. Malik is currently serving as member, Punjab Public Service Commission.

Education 
 UNESCO Diploma for Leadership Role for Promotion of Education and Skill Development with title of Honorable Mention and Confucius Award 2011
 Charles Wallace Trust Fellow (2010-2011). Public Policy, Governance and Economic Development in Pakistan: Issues and Challenges - SOAS London UK
 Post-Doc Visiting Scholar (2006-2008). Privatization of Education in Public Private Partnership: Freedom of Choice: Affordable Quality Education in Public Private Partnership. Teachers College, Columbia University, New York, USA
 PhD (2003). Development Economics: Public Finance and Resource Mobilization, Punjab University Lahore Pakistan.
 MPhil (1993–94) Chevening Scholar: Economics and Politics of Development:, Cambridge University –United Kingdom.
 LLB (1996) Punjab University Lahore Pakistan.
 MA (1985) Punjab University Lahore Pakistan .
 Post Graduate Diploma (1981) Economics, Development and Financial Management, HBL Training Institute Karachi Pakistan.
 Graduation (1980) Punjab University Lahore Pakistan.

References

Sources
 https://www.linkedin.com/in/dr-allah-bakhsh-malik-unesco-confucius-laureate-b3395426/detail/treasury/summary/?entityUrn=urn%3Ali%3Afs_treasuryMedia%3A(ACoAAAV6wlcBcuM4wiEFBakMukYOqZgjZbThkTg%2C50576010)&section=summary&treasuryCount=2
 https://www.linkedin.com/in/dr-allah-bakhsh-malik-unesco-confucius-laureate-b3395426/detail/treasury/summary/?entityUrn=urn%3Ali%3Afs_treasuryMedia%3A(ACoAAAV6wlcBcuM4wiEFBakMukYOqZgjZbThkTg%2C50815275)&section=summary&treasuryCount=2

External links
 ‘Making Punjab literate by 2020’: Making the impossible possible - Interview with Allah Bakhsh Malik
 https://books.google.com/books?id=Il2Wap9CfmEC&pg=PR5&lpg=PR5&dq=The+foundation+of+success+Dr.+Allah+Bakhsh+Malik&source=bl&ots=_FMlizr2Iz&sig
 https://books.google.com/books?id=Sb5uyUpAr1QC&pg=PP1&dq
 http://www.ncspe.org/publications_files/OP154.pdf
 https://web.archive.org/web/20160222133242/http://newblankets.org/Malik/PYP_2012.pdf
 http://unesdoc.unesco.org/images/0021/002196/219681e.pdf
 http://www.dpisepunjab.pk/gallery/
 https://www.economist.com/briefing/2018/01/04/pakistan-is-home-to-the-most-frenetic-education-reforms-in-the-world

Pakistani educational theorists
Punjabi people
Living people
Year of birth missing (living people)